The River Teifi in Wales forms the boundary for most of its length between the counties of Ceredigion and Carmarthenshire, and for the final  of its total length of , the boundary between Ceredigion and Pembrokeshire.  Its estuary is northwest of Cardigan, known in Welsh as Aberteifi, meaning 'mouth of the Teifi'. Teifi has formerly been anglicised as "Tivy".

Geography
The Teifi has its source in Llyn Teifi, one of several lakes known collectively as the Teifi Pools. This wide area of Mid-Wales, with a very sparse population, is part of what is sometimes called the "Desert of Wales". The river flows past Strata Florida Abbey and then through Pontrhydfendigaid before turning broadly southwest. Here it passes through Cors Caron, one of the great raised mires of Britain also known as Tregaron Bog or Cors Goch Glanteifi (translates from Welsh as red bog on the banks of the Teifi). From here the river descends through pastures and bogs forming meanders on farmland below. Several small tributaries join from the valley with gorges, rocky and tree-lined sections also in the area.

Over the next , the Teifi meanders southwest in a gentle arc passing through Tregaron, Llanddewi Brefi, Cwmann, Lampeter, Llanybydder, Llandysul, Newcastle Emlyn, and Cenarth. The river is tidal below Llechryd, descending through the steep-sided Cilgerran Gorge to Cardigan. West of Cardigan and St Dogmaels, the river broadens into a wide estuary with  Poppit Sands on its west bank and Gwbert on its east bank as it enters Cardigan Bay.

On the lower parts of the river the wildlife is rich. There is a large variety ranging from water-crowfoot to Atlantic salmon as well as otters, wetland birds and multi fruited river moss. There have also been sightings of bottle-nosed dolphins where the river opens into the estuary.

The river is susceptible to flooding and there were some heavy floods in 2007 and 2008. If the swollen river is backed up by a high tide, flooding can occur in Cardigan and as far up river as Llechryd. The most recent flooding was in December 2015.

The principal tributaries of the Teifi (ordered from source to sea) are as follows: Afon Mwyro, Nant Glasffrwd, Afon Meurig, Afon Fflur, Camddwr Fach, Camddwr, Brennig, Nant Carfan, Afon Brefi, Nant Digonest, Nant Clywedog, Ffrwd Cynon, Nant Gou, Nant Dulas, Nant Hathren, Nant Eiddig, Nant y Gwragedd, Nant Dolgwm, Afon Granell, Afon Duar, Nant Hust, Nant Ceiliog, Nant Caradog, Nant Cwm-du, Nant Cledlyn, Nant Fylchog, Afon Clettwr, Nant Wern-macwydd, Gwenffrwd, Afon Cerdin, Afon Tyweli, Nant Merwydd, Hoffnant, Afon Gwr-fach, Afon Siedi, Camnant, Nant Bachnog, Nant Iago, Nant Bargod, Afon Cynllo, Afon Cwm-wern, Nant Halen, Afon Arad, Nant Sarah, Afon Ceri, Afon Nawmor, Afon Hirwaun, Afon Cych, Afon Eifed, Nant Arberth, Afon Morgenau, Afon Plysgog, Nant Rhyd-y-fuwch, Afon Piliau, Afon Mwldan, Nant Degwen, Nant-y-ferwig.

Geology and landscape
The Teifi and its tributaries are underlain by ancient Ordovician and Silurian mudstones which have been extensively glaciated during the ice ages. The resultant landform is one of gently rolling hills supporting a range of agriculture in which dairy and sheep farming dominate. Ceredigion had the reputation of supplying London with its milk in the 19th century. The landscapes of the Teifi valley are very attractive and the Teifi is considered by many to be one of the most beautiful rivers in Wales.

Teifi Pools, the source of the Teifi, are a series of small upland lakes left by past glacial activity. The lakes are acid in nature. Some have been enlarged by damming and now provide a source of drinking water. The very extensive raised mire above Tregaron acts as a huge sponge at the head of the river and evens out extremes in flow.

Rapids and waterfalls are uncommon but the examples at Henllan and, especially at Cenarth, are noteworthy and have been extensively photographed and painted because of the beauty of the landscape. A dramatic painting of the falls was made by Frank Miles and is now at Nottingham City Museum. Miles's father inherited Cardigan Priory from his father, Philip John Miles, but lived in Nottinghamshire as Rector of Bingham.

The river enters a narrow gorge between Llechryd and Cilgerran, the sides of which are thickly wooded with a distinctive under-storey flora of wood rush.

SSSI

The Teifi has been designated as a  Site of Special Scientific Interest (SSSI) since December 1997 in an attempt to protect the rare and unique features and species within it. This SSSI has been notified as being of both geological and biological importance. It is protected by law. The site has an area of 778.18 hectares and is managed by Natural Resources Wales.

Hydrology

The catchment of the river is estimated to be  yielding an average flow at Glan Teifi, just upstream of Llechryd Bridge, of 29.126 m³/s. The maximum recorded flow between 1959 and 2011 was 373.6 m³/s on 18 October 1987.

Culture and history

The Teifi valley has been inhabited since pre-history. There are many remains of Iron Age and Stone Age man including cromlechs (burial chambers) and standing stones. The remains of a medieval abbey stand at Strata Florida with some excellent examples of encaustic tiles on the floors. The river flows near to the Lampeter campus of the University of Wales, Trinity Saint David, its predecessor, the University of Wales, Lampeter (est. 1822) having been the oldest university established in Wales.  The river forms the southern boundary of the hamlet of Pen-y-wenallt.

Between Cenarth and Cardigan, there is an ancient tradition of fishing and travel using coracles – very simple light-weight boats made of bent sticks covered with waterproofed hide or skins. These are paddled by a single oar used at the front of the craft which requires great skill. The principal use for coracles is for salmon fishing using nets. This form of fishing is now very tightly controlled and the right to fish in this way is passed down from father to son. There is also an age-old tradition of illegal salmon and sea-trout fishing in the lower Teifi. In 1188 Giraldus Cambrensis observed what is thought to have been the last colony of European beaver in England or Wales on the Teifi.

See also
 Cardigan Castle
 Cenarth Falls
 Cilgerran Castle
 Coedmor National Nature Reserve
 Teifi Valley Railway

References

Teifi
Teifi
Teifi
Sites of Special Scientific Interest in Ceredigion
Teifi